The Bathtub Trust was where the Standard Sanitary Manufacturing Company and forty-nine other companies engaged in anti-competitive practices in 1912. However, it was soon broken by President William Howard Taft. The case was heard by the Supreme Court of the United States as Standard Sanitary Mfg. Co. v. United States. Joseph R. Darling was a special agent of the United States Department of Justice who prepared the case. In 1915 he wrote "Darling on Trusts" a legal treatise.

References

Supreme Court of the United States
Anti-competitive practices